Andreas Mjøs (born 1 March 1976 in Tønsberg, Norway) is a Norwegian musician, record producer and composer, known from a series of performances and albums within Jaga Jazzist. He is also on a number of other album releases both as performer and producer.

Discography (in selection)

Solo albums 
Within «Rotoscope» including Jørgen Træen, Knut Aalefjær, Rune Brøndbo, Lars Horntveth, Rob Waring & Christine Sandtorv
2001: Great Curves (Jester), feat. Hild Sofie Tafjord & Marius Reksjø (also as composer & producer)

Collaborations 
With Gebhardt & Mjøs
2005: Alt for Norge (Apache)

Within Jaga Jazzist
1996: Jævla Jazzist Grete Stitz (Thug)
1998: Magazine EP (Dbut)
2001: A Livingroom Hush (Warner Music Norway)
2001: Airborne/Going Down EP (Warner Music Norway)
2001: Going Down 12" (Smalltown Supersound)
2002: The Stix (Smalltown Supersound / Warner Music Norway)
2002: Days 12", (Smalltown Supersound)
2003: Animal Chin EP 12" (Golden Standard Labs)
2005: What We Must (Ninja Tune / Smalltown Supersound / Sonet)
2010: One-Armed Bandit (Sonet)

Within «In The Country»
2009: White Out (Rune Grammofon)
2011: Sounds And Sights (Rune Grammofon)

With other projects
2000: Clouds Rolling By (Warner Music Norway), with Bigbang
2001: Alfabet (Warner Music Norway), with Anne Grete Preus
2004: Miracle Working Man (Stickman & Sticksisters), with «HGH»
2004: List of Lights and Buoys (Rune Grammofon), with Susanna & the Magical Orchestra
2005: Adjágas (Trust Me), with Adjagas
2010: Synlige Hjerteslag (Grappa), with Frida Ånnevik
2010: World of the Free (Universal / Trust Me), with Haddy N'jie

As producer
2000 - Stella Polaris, Tristan & Isolde (Stella Polaris)
2004 - Susanna and the Magical Orchestra, List of Lights and Buoys (Rune Grammofon)
2005 - Adjagas, Adjagas (Trust Me )
2007 - Saralunden/Bjørkaas/Mjøs, Dubious (Nexsound)
2007 - Levi Henriksen & Thomas Mårud, Bang bang rett ned (Norskamerikaner)
2007 - «Slagr», Solaris (NorCD)
2007 - «Dinosau», A Little Crime (Propeller)
2009 - Adjagas: Manu Rávdnji (Trust Me)
2009 - «In The Country»: White Out (Rune Grammofon)
2009 - «One People»: Teranga Vol 2 (MTG)
2010 - Frida Ånnevik: Synlige Hjerteslag (Grappa )
2010 - Haddy N'jie: World of the Free (Universal/Trust Me)
2011 - «Kaia»: La La La (Northern Sound)
2011 - : Detoxing (no) (BluesNews)
2012 - Heidi Solheim: Found (Finito Bacalao/Phonofile)

References

External links 
Jaga Jazzist Official Website

Jaga Jazzist members
20th-century Norwegian multi-instrumentalists
21st-century Norwegian multi-instrumentalists
Norwegian jazz vibraphonists
Norwegian percussionists
Norwegian jazz guitarists
Norwegian jazz composers
Male jazz composers
Norwegian record producers
Musicians from Tønsberg
1976 births
Living people